Andrew M. Green is a former librarian at the National Library of Wales in Aberystwyth, who held the role from 1998 to 2013. His predecessor was J. Lionel Madden. The role has been influential in Wales, since John Ballinger first took up the position in 1909.

Green's career had been in British university libraries including the University College of Wales, Aberystwyth (1973–74), University College Cardiff (1975–89), University of Sheffield (1989–92) and was the Director of Library and Information Services at the University of Wales, Swansea (1992–98).

Though not a native Welsh speaker (having been born and raised in England) Green is fluent in the language. At the 2009 National Eisteddfod, the Gorsedd of Bards honoured him with bestowal of the white bardic robes of a druid. His bardic name is Gwallter bach ("Little Walter").

Public statements
In 2005, Green criticised the Welsh Tourist Board for the way it advertised Wales, using old-fashioned and stereotypical concepts of the country. He also suggested that Wales could benefit from attracting genealogy tourists to use the materials available at the National Library, in the same way as Ireland successfully attracts expatriates from the United States to visit the country and research their origins.

Organizations
Green is an officer or member of numerous bodies, including the Society of College, National and University Libraries (SCONUL) (Chair 2002–2004), the Legal Deposit Advisory Panel, the Legal Deposit Libraries Committee, the Research Information Network Funders' Group, the CyMAL Advisory Council, the Chartered Institute of Library and Information Professionals (CILIP) Wales (President), the Wales Higher Education Libraries Forum (WHELF) (Chair), and the Welsh Committee of the British Council. He was a member of the steering bodies of the Research Support Libraries Programme (RSLP) and the Research Support Libraries Group (RSLG).

Between 2014 and 2017, Green was Chair of Coleg Cymraeg Cenedlaethol, an organisation that aims to establish the future sustainability of the Welsh language within academia.

References 

Living people
Welsh librarians
Welsh-speaking academics
Year of birth missing (living people)